The Waterloo Public Library is a historic building located in Waterloo, Iowa, United States.   The public library was established there in 1896.  It operated out of two rented rooms, one on the east side  of the Cedar River and other on the west side.  The Carnegie Foundation agreed to grant the community $21,000 to build this building and a similar amount for the east side branch on April 11, 1902.  Waterloo architect J.G. Ralston designed both buildings in the Neoclassical style.  They were both dedicated on February 23, 1906.  The single-story brick structure has a projecting entrance pavilion capped with a triangular pediment that is supported by Ionic columns.  Also noteworthy are the corner piers that feature bands of brick squares set into the stone.  In 1977 voters in Waterloo approved a $3,650,000 bond referendum to renovate the city's 1938 post office and federal building to house the library.  The post office vacated the building in 1979 when it relocated. The old library building was listed on the National Register of Historic Places in 1983.  It now houses law offices.

References

Library buildings completed in 1906
Carnegie libraries in Iowa
Neoclassical architecture in Iowa
Buildings and structures in Waterloo, Iowa
National Register of Historic Places in Black Hawk County, Iowa
Libraries on the National Register of Historic Places in Iowa
1906 establishments in Iowa